From 1870 to the present day, the Scotland national football team have played various matches that are not accorded the status of official (FIFA) internationals by the governing body, the Scottish Football Association. These include early matches against England prior to the first-ever official international in 1872, wartime fixtures between 1914–1919 and 1939–1946 when official competitions were suspended, overseas tour matches played by a Scotland XI of varying strength and status, and others as specified.

While some of the tour matches (involving players under consideration for the national team, some having already been capped at full level) could be seen as similar in status to those played by the Scotland B team, they have not been recorded officially as such.

List of Matches

1870s–1910s

1870–1872 England v Scotland matches

The selection of the Scottish XI were players drawn from living and working in and around London area. Some of the players' Scottish links were tenuous and in some cases non-existent.

Names of note included Alexander Morten, who played in the first match, Arnold Kirke-Smith, who played in two matches, and William Lindsay, who played in all five matches, of the Scotland representative team were all in fact later capped by the official England national team.

1880
In 1880, a Scottish tour of Canada and The United States was suggested. Several preparatory matches were played, mostly against club sides and including a mini-tour of northern England, with the potential traveling squad referred to as the 'Scotch Canadians'. However, the tour itself never went ahead after the death of its main organiser, SFA secretary William Dick. Four matches are detailed below:

1888

1891

1900
A testimonial match for Everton's Scottish player Willie Muir in September 1900 was played between 'Englishmen' and 'Scotchmen' based at Merseyside clubs; the Scots won 2–1.

1901
A exhibition match with Germany was scheduled for 28 September 1901 as part of the Glasgow International Exhibition, but was cancelled due to a disagreement over funds; the visiting German team lost 12–0 to England's amateur team a few days earlier.

1902

A testimonial match for Liverpool's Scottish player William Goldie in November 1902 was played between an 'England Select XI ' and a 'Scotland Select XI' drawn from players at Merseyside clubs; the Scots won 4–0.

1913
 A testimonial match for Rangers and Scotland winger Alec Smith was played in January 1913 between Rangers and an 'International XI' including the retired RS McColl, but this featured Wales international Billy Meredith.

1914
A testimonial match for Partick Thistle and Scotland player Alex Raisbeck was played in January 1914 between Partick and an 'International XI' team, but this included England international Jack Parkinson and several other players who had never played for Scotland.

World War I

By the end of the first year of fighting during World War I, most official football tournaments were suspended (a notable exception was the Scottish Football League Division One). International matches took place very occasionally during the duration of the war itself (July 1914 to November 1918) with Scotland only playing two, both military benefit matches against England. Following the Allied victory, regular sports events began to return, and Scotland played in two Victory International matches against Ireland followed by two against England in Spring 1919. Established competitions and fully recognised international matches resumed in the 1919–20 season.

1915
A fundraising match for the Belgian Refugee Relief Fund was played between an 'International XI' and an 'Edinburgh XI' in April 1915; the internationals included England's Joseph Hodkinson, Billy Meredith of Wales and William Crone who had played for the Irish League (Bobby Walker and Peter Nellies of Hearts also switched sides pre-match to cover for call-offs).

1920s–1940s

1920
A Testimonial match for Partick Thistle and Scotland player Jimmy McMullan was played in April 1920 between Partick and an 'International Select' team.

1921 Tour of USA and Canada
A Scotland XI tour of Canada and the USA was organised by Glasgow club Third Lanark and the Dominion of Canada Football Association. Some local publications of the time listed the visitors as 'Third Lanark', others as 'Scotland'.

Squad: 

Alec Bennett (Albion Rovers)
Craig Brown (Motherwell)
Jimmy Brownlie (Third Lanark)
Willie Bulloch (Partick Thistle)
Jimmy Gordon (Dunfermline Athletic)
John Low (Dunfermline Athletic)
Tom Maxwell (Dunfermline Athletic)
Willie McAndrew (Third Lanark)

Neil McBain (Ayr United)
Charlie McCormack (Third Lanark)
Jimmy McMenemy (Partick Thistle)
Bobby Orr (Third Lanark)
Willie Rankin (Motherwell)
James Scott (Dumbarton)
Doug Thomson (Aberdeen)
Andy Wilson (Dunfermline Athletic)

25 matches were played, with 24 wins, 1 draw and 0 defeats. 1 match is detailed below:

1923
Third Lanark undertook another summer tour in 1923, this time to South America (eight matches), and again guest players from other clubs were invited, the most high-profile being Hughie Ferguson, but although apparently some attempt was made to portray this as a 'Scotland team', this was much less prevalent than for the 1921 tour and only one of the players had been capped at full level (Robert Orrock who played in one match ten years earlier).

1927
A testimonial match for Bradford City defender Willie Watson was played in April 1927 between Bradford and a 'Scottish Internationals' team, but this included Ireland international Bert Manderson and several other players who had never played for Scotland.

1927 Tour of USA and Canada
A Scotland XI tour of North America was organised by the SFA in 1927.

Squad: 

Sandy Archibald (Rangers)
Danny Blair (Clyde)
Jock Buchanan (Morton)
Willie Cook (Dundee)
Tully Craig (Rangers)
Andy Cunningham (Rangers)
Patsy Gallacher (Falkirk)
Tom Hamilton (Rangers)
John Hunter (Falkirk)

Adam McLean (Celtic)
Jimmy McStay (Celtic)
Willie McStay (Celtic)
Tom Morrison (St Mirren)
Tommy Muirhead (Rangers)
Jimmy Munro (St Johnstone)
Tom Scott (Falkirk)
Jimmy Simpson (Dundee United)
Andy Swallow (St Johnstone)

20 matches were played, with 19 wins, 0 draws and 1 defeat. 3 matches are detailed below:

1929

A friendly match between Scotland and the Netherlands in June 1929 was retrospectively considered not to be official by the Royal Dutch Football Association due to their disapproval of professionalism in the sport–all the Scotland players were professionals. The SFA regards it as official.

1932
A friendly match in Copenhagen on 9 October 1932 in which Denmark defeated the Scotland amateur team 3–1 is regarded as a full international by the Danish Football Union, and consequently has sometimes been included in overviews of matches between the nations.

1935 Tour of USA and Canada
A Scotland XI tour of North America was organised by the SFA in 1935.

Squad: 

Andrew Anderson (Heart of Midlothian)
George Cummings (Partick Thistle)
Bob Donnelly (Partick Thistle)
Dally Duncan (Derby County)
Alex Ferguson (St Johnstone)
Bob Fraser (Aberdeen
Hughie Gallacher (Derby County)
Bobby Main (Rangers)
Whitey McDonald (Rangers)

Davie Meiklejohn (Rangers)
Willie Miller (Partick Thistle)
Willie Mills (Aberdeen)
Tom Smith (Kilmarnock)
William Stevenson (Clyde)
Tommy Walker (Heart of Midlothian)
Dave Wilson (Hamilton Academical)
Peter Wilson (Celtic)

13 matches were played, with 13 wins, 0 draws and 0 defeats. 2 matches are detailed below:

1935

1939 Tour of USA and Canada
A Scotland XI tour of North America was organised by the SFA in 1939.

Squad: 

Bobby Bolt (Falkirk)
Jimmy Carabine (Third Lanark)
Jimmy Caskie (St Johnstone)
Jerry Dawson (Rangers)
Jimmy Dykes (Heart of Midlothian)
Ben Ellis (Motherwell)
Archie Garrett (Heart of Midlothian)
John Gillies (Clyde)
Dougie Gray (Rangers)

George Hamilton (Aberdeen)
Jack Jones (Third Lanark)
Willie Lyon (Celtic)
Doug McAvoy (Kilmarnock)
Malky MacDonald (Celtic)
Tommy McIntyre (Hibernian)
Tommy McKenzie (Motherwell)
Sandy McNab (West Bromwich Albion)

14 matches were played, with 13 wins, 1 draw and 0 defeats. 2 matches are detailed below:

World War II

Official football tournaments were suspended soon after the outbreak of World War II in Autumn 1939. International matches took place occasionally during the duration of the war itself, with Scotland playing against England 15 times, a team representing the Republic of Ireland once, and various branches of the British armed forces who could call on strong squads of professional players called into service. In addition, there were six 'Army Internationals' nominally between Scotland and England, but with the players selected from members of the military stationed in each country regardless of their heritage (the 'Army in England' team won five of these, with one draw).

When the conflict ended in May 1945 with an Allied victory, regular sports events began to return, and Scotland participated in, and won, the 1945–46 British Victory Home Championship. Two further Victory International matches in 1946 against Belgium and Switzerland are considered to have full international status. All established competitions and fully recognised international matches resumed in the 1946–47 season, the outset of which included one further unofficial England v Scotland match to raise funds for those affected by the Burnden Park disaster earlier that year.

British Victory Home Championship

1946

1947
On 10 May 1947, a Great Britain XI played a Europe XI at Hampden Park to commemorate the Home Nations rejoining FIFA. The GB team, which won the match 6–1 in front of over 130,000, wore the dark blue of Scotland to acknowledge the venue location, but only three Scottish players were involved.

1949

1949 Tour of USA and Canada
A Scotland XI tour of North America was organised by the SFA in 1949.

Squad: 

George Aitken (East Fife)
Jimmy Brown (Heart of Midlothian)
Sammy Cox (Rangers)
Bobby Evans (Celtic)
Jock Govan (Hibernian)
Billy Houliston (Queen of the South)
Johnny MacKenzie (Partick Thistle)
Tommy Orr (Morton)

Willie Redpath (Motherwell)
Lawrie Reilly (Hibernian)
Billy Steel (Derby County)
Willie Telfer (St Mirren)
Willie Thornton (Rangers)
Willie Waddell (Rangers)
Willie Woodburn (Rangers)
George Young (Rangers)

9 matches were played, with 8 wins, 0 draws and 1 defeat. 3 matches are detailed below:

1950s–1970s

1952

1953

1954

1955

1956

1958

1959

1960

1961

1962

1963
Scotland's friendly against Austria in 1963 was abandoned by the referee on 79 minutes due to violent play, particularly by the Austrians; however caps were awarded and it is recognised as a full international by FIFA.

1964

1966

1967 Tour

A Scotland XI tour of Israel, Hong Kong, Australia, New Zealand and Canada was organised by the SFA in 1967. In October 2021, the SFA announced that some of the tour matches (against Australia, Canada and Israel) would be reclassified as full internationals. This meant that some players who had not otherwise played for Scotland were belatedly awarded international caps, including Alex Ferguson.

There was a match with a Chinese XI on 22 May, which was cancelled because of rioting in Hong Kong.

Squad: 

Alan Anderson (Heart of Midlothian)
Willie Callaghan (Dunfermline Athletic)
Eddie Colquhoun (West Bromwich Albion)
Jim Cruickshank (Heart of Midlothian)
Alex Ferguson (Dunfermline Athletic)
Doug Fraser (West Bromwich Albion)
Joe Harper (Huddersfield Town)
Harry Hood (Clyde )
Bobby Hope (West Bromwich Albion)
Jim McCalliog (Sheffield Wednesday)

Jackie McGrory (Kilmarnock)
Tommy McLean (Kilmarnock)
Willie Morgan (Burnley)
Andy Penman (Rangers)
Harry Thomson (Burnley)
Hugh Tinney (Bury)
Jim Townsend (St Johnstone)
Ian Ure (Arsenal)
John Woodward (Arsenal)

Nine matches were played during the tour, all of which were won.  Following a reassessment by the SFA, five of the games are now classified as full internationals. Details of the other four matches are given below:

1971

1972
Partick Thistle went on a tour of Southeast Asia in summer 1972, including matches against Selangor FA, an Indonesian XI and Lokomotiv Plovdiv of Bulgaria, which were falsely promoted as 'Scotland vs Malaysia / Indonesia / Bulgaria' by the local organisers to attract spectators, and large crowds did attend.

1976

1977

1978

1980s–present

1982

1986
A benefit match for former Scotland captain George Young was played in May 1986 between 'Young's XI' which contained several current internationals and wore the Scotland kit, and 'Don Revie's XI' which wore the England kit.

1990

1996

No caps were awarded to Scottish players who were on the field for the scheduled match against Estonia during 1998 FIFA World Cup qualification on 9 October 1996, when a scheduling dispute over floodlights led to Scotland turning up at an earlier time and kicking off against no opposition, while Estonia insisted on adhering to the original later time. All records for this fixture relate to the rearranged match played in Monaco on 11 February 1997.

2002

Caps were awarded by the SFA for a match in May 2002 between the Hong Kong League XI and Scotland as part of the HKSAR Reunification Cup, although it was not a full FIFA international.

2004
Scotland's 2004 friendly match against Spain in Valencia was abandoned on 59 minutes due to floodlight failure; however caps were awarded and FIFA recognise it as a full international.

See also
:Category:England v Scotland representative footballers (1870–1872)
List of Scotland wartime international footballers
Scotland national football B team#Results and fixtures

References

 
Wartime association football
Lists of national association football team unofficial results
1870–71 in Scottish football
1871–72 in Scottish football
1888–89 in Scottish football
1891–92 in Scottish football
1901–02 in Scottish football
1902–03 in Scottish football
1915–16 in Scottish football
1918–19 in Scottish football
1921–22 in Scottish football
1927–28 in Scottish football
1928–29 in Scottish football
1934–35 in Scottish football
1935–36 in Scottish football
1938–39 in Scottish football
1939–40 in Scottish football
1940–41 in Scottish football
1941–42 in Scottish football
1942–43 in Scottish football
1943–44 in Scottish football
1944–45 in Scottish football
1945–46 in Scottish football
1946–47 in Scottish football
1948–49 in Scottish football
1958–59 in Scottish football
1966–67 in Scottish football
1990–91 in Scottish football
Military association football